The Cook County Board of Review is an independent office created by statute by the Illinois General Assembly and is governed by three commissioners who are elected by district for two- or four-year terms. Cook County, which includes Chicago, is the United States' second-most populous county (after Los Angeles County, California) with a population of 5.2 million residents.

History
The board had been first created after the task of hearing tax appeals was transferred from the Cook County Board of Commissioners to a three member Board of Review. The Revenue Act of 1939 converted this appeals system into a two member Cook County Board of Appeals. Both members were elected in a single at-large election held quadrennially. It remained this way until 1998. In 1996, the Illinois Legislature successfully passed Public Act 89-671, which made it so that, in 1998, the Cook County Board of Appeals would be renamed Cook County Board of Review and be reconstituted as a three-member body.

Responsibilities 
The Board of Review allows residential and commercial property owners to contest an assessment made by the Cook County assessor that they believe incorrect or unjust. The Cook County Board of Review is vested with quasi-judicial powers to adjudicate taxpayer complaints or recommend exempt status of real property, which includes: residential, commercial, industrial, condominium property, and vacant land. There are approximately 1.8 million parcels of property in Cook County. The Board of Review adjudicated 422,713 parcel appeals in the 2012 assessment year.

Elections
Members are elected by district.

The Cook County Board of Review has its three seats rotate the length of terms. In a staggered fashion (in which no two seats have coinciding two-year terms), the seats rotate between two consecutive four-year terms and a two-year term.

The following table indicates whether a seat was/will be up for election in a given year:

Composition

Commissioners

Current
This is a list of the Cook County Board Of Review Commissioners in order by district. This list is current as of December 2022:

Past
Individuals who served on the original three-member Cook County Board of Review included Patrick Nash.

Individuals who served on the two-member Cook County Board of Appeals included Joseph Berrios, Wilson Frost, Pat Quinn, and Harry H. Semrow.

Members of the Cook County Board of Review (1998–present)

See also 
 Cook County Board of Commissioners
 Chicago City Council

References

External links 
Cook County Board Of Review official government website